Boothby Graffoe (born James Martyn Rogers, 1962) is an English comedian, singer, songwriter and playwright. He is particularly known for his surreal sense of humour and work with Canadian band Barenaked Ladies.

Early life
Rogers was born in 1962 in Hull, East Riding of Yorkshire, England. For the latter part of his schooling, he attended Queen Elizabeth's Grammar School, Horncastle. At the age of 18, he became a member of the redcoats at a Butlins on the south coast. He named his alter ego after an English village while driving back from a gig in the late 1980s. His family still live in the Tattershall area. He claims to be the only comedian in the world named after a Lincolnshire village.

Stand-up comedy
Graffoe often incorporates guitar playing into his stage act, through his oddball (and usually slightly twisted) songs, including such titles as "Planet Dog", "Woof" and his album's title track, "Wot Italian" (sometimes referred to as "Umbrella Head Boy"). Some of his song titles are still more surreal, in that they do not reflect the subject matter, such as "Giraffes Don't Play Harmonicas, So It Can't Be a Giraffe" and "The Consequences of Living in a Container". He is currently accompanied by the violinist Nick Pynn, having previously toured with acoustic guitarist Antonio Forcione.

He explained his reasons for increasingly irrelevant song titles as – essentially – ways to avoid giving away the key phrases or punchlines in his songs. For instance, he renamed "Umbrella Head Boy" to "Wot Italian" after realising that audiences familiar with his work would ask him to "Play Umbrella Head Boy", thus rendering the surprise element of this line in the song redundant to others.

In 2005 he participated in the Danish stand-up tour "Stand-up DK|UK|OK" with Danish comedians Rune Klan, Carsten Eskelund and Geo, this went on tour around Denmark and was never released on DVD.

On a tour of Scotland in February–March 2007, Graffoe announced his intention to retire from stand-up comedy and concentrate on writing for Omid Djalili. He subsequently toured as a warm-up act for Djalili and Barenaked Ladies, but has recently announced a new tour and album (Songs for Dogs' Funerals). He is a regular performer at the annual Edinburgh Festival Fringe.

Graffoe has won several awards, including the 2002 Adelaide Fringe Award for Excellence, and the Time Out Comedy Award. He has been nominated for British comedy's prestigious Perrier Award.

Radio
Graffoe started his career in 1988 on BBC Radio Lincolnshire, when he presented a two-hour programme (Boothby Graffoe Live) on Friday evenings until late 1990.

He appeared regularly on BBC Radio 4's Loose Ends with Ned Sherrin.

He made the following comedy and music series for Radio 4:
 The Big Booth Radio 4 (2000–01)
 Boothby Graffoe In No Particular Order Radio 4 (2003–05)

Television
In 2003, Graffoe appeared on NBC's Late Night with Conan O'Brien and also caused a stir on Opportunity Knocks during the late 1980s when he wrapped sellotape around his head for comedy effect.
In 2013 he appeared as one of a number of acts in The Alternative Comedy Experience performing at The Stand in Edinburgh and also being interviewed backstage by the curator of the show Stewart Lee.

Music
In 2004 Graffoe released his first album of songs with Antonio Forcione, Wot Italian?. A second disc followed in 2006, a live recording of a show in Brighton billed as Boothby Graffoe & the Following People, the backing band including Nick Pynn.

Graffoe has acted as support for Canadian band Barenaked Ladies on its "Last Summer on Earth" 2013 tour and on four of Barenaked Ladies' UK tours: first in 2004 for the Barenaked for the Holidays tour, then in 2007 on the Barenaked Ladies Are Me tour,  again in 2010 on the band's All In Good Time tour and finally on the band's Detour de Force tour in 2022. Boothby mostly performs solo, with various members of the band joining him to play bass (Jim Creeggan), keyboard (Kevin Hearn) and drums (guitarist Ed Robertson) for some of the songs.

In January 2008, Graffoe joined the line-up for Barenaked Ladies' cruise Ships and Dip, where he performed solo and with members from BNL and other bands on board. The cruise, with a capacity of 2500, provided some North American attendees with their first experience of Graffoe and his comedy. He returned for two further Ships and Dip cruises in 2009 and 2011.

Boothby's third album, Songs For Dogs, Funerals..... was released in February 2011, featuring studio recordings of three tracks from Boothby Graffoe & The Following People together with a selection of all-new tracks. Musicians appearing on the album included Nick Pynn, Theseus Gerard and Dean Friedman.

His fourth album, Bang! Is This Your Vehicle, Sir? was released on 27 February 2012. The album features guest appearances from Nick Pynn, Kevin Hearn, Omid Djalili, and members of Canadian band Thin Buckle.

A fifth album, Nomad, was released in March 2013, following a successful campaign on Kickstarter.

He has championed the work of surreal songwriter Syd Meats, often including Meats' songs, such as "Far Too Serious", in his set.

In the summer of 2013, he served as the first act on Barenaked Ladies' 'Last Summer On Earth Tour,' which also featured Guster and Ben Folds Five.

During 2020, he began a series of online concerts via the Zoom platform, with performances from himself and invited guests such as Robyn Hitchcock and Tim Vine.

Stage plays written by Boothby Graffoe
 The Condition of the Virgin, 2001
 One Night Stand: God and Adam, 2002
 Hitler Sells Tickets, 2004
All three plays were subsequently adapted for BBC Radio.

Books
 Sit-Down Comedy (contributor to anthology, ed Malcolm Hardee & John Fleming) Ebury Press/Random House, 2003.  ;

DVDs
 Boothby Graffoe and the Following People - May 2009
 The Boothby Graffoe Mish Mash - March 2013

References

External links
 
 
 

1962 births
Living people
English stand-up comedians
English dramatists and playwrights
English comedy musicians
English male comedians
English songwriters
Musicians from Kingston upon Hull
People from Horncastle, Lincolnshire
Butlins Redcoats
People educated at Queen Elizabeth's Grammar School, Horncastle
Writers from Kingston upon Hull
English male dramatists and playwrights
20th-century English comedians
21st-century English comedians